Haji Özbek Mosque is a historical Ottoman mosque in Iznik, Turkey.

The Mosque
The  Haji Özbek Mosque (1333) in Iznik, which was the first important centre of Ottoman art, is a prime example of Ottoman single-domed mosque, which illustrates a combination of Byzantine building techniques and Muslim needs. The drum of the dome of the mosque is dodecagonal and adorned with a band of triangular planes on the interior. The mosque consists of a triple layer of brick with alternating layers of individually cut stone separated by vertically laid brick.

In 1939 the three-bay portico preceding the hall to the west was demolished, to make space for road expansion. The portico, was roofed with a barrel vault to the south and a mirror vault on the north. In the place of the demolished portico, a new enclosed portico was added to the northern side of the building in the year 1959. The mosque never had a minaret. The ornamental details of the interior have been lost under the layers of plaster. For the construction of the mosque, brick and rubble stone, was used, together with saw-toothed brick cornices at the top of the walls and terra-cotta tileswere used on the brick dome.

References

 History of Ottoman Architecture, J. Freely, 2010

External links 

 Haci Özbek Camii, Archnet

Mosques in Iznik
Ottoman architecture in Turkey
İznik
Mosque buildings with domes
Mosques completed in 1333